Santiago Ulio (31 May 1909 – 3 June 1981) was a Spanish diver. He competed in two events at the 1924 Summer Olympics.

References

External links
 

1909 births
1981 deaths
Spanish male divers
Olympic divers of Spain
Divers at the 1924 Summer Olympics
Sportspeople from Barcelona